Henry Krtschil (3 October 1932 – 7 July 2020) was a German composer, music producer and pianist. He worked for 25 years as a film composer for Deutscher Fernsehfunk and over 30 years with the German singer Gisela May.

Krtschil studied music between 1951 and 1956 at Hochschule für Musik "Hanns Eisler". Then he was a Répétiteur for one year at Staatliche Ballettschule Berlin and until 1970 at Berliner Ensemble. Between 1970 and 1977 he worked at the theatre Volksbühne. From 1991 until his retirement in 1999 he worked as a composer and pianist at Theater im Palais.

Selected filmography 
 1965: Schule der Frauen
 1972: Der Mann seiner Frau
 1977: Der Stein des Glücks
 1978: Polizeiruf 110: Doppeltes Spiel
 1978: Rentner haben niemals Zeit
 1980: Abenteuer mit den Abrafaxen
 1982: Der Hase und der Igel
 1982: Geschichten übern Gartenzaun
 1985: Der verzauberte Weihnachtsmann
 1987: Der Hauptmann von Köpenick
 1987: Polizeiruf 110: Die letzte Kundin
 1989: Die Irrfahrten des Weihnachtsmannes

References

 Ulrike Borowczyk: Knochenarbeit am Klavier. In: Berliner Morgenpost, Jg. 101, Nr. 183, July 8, 1999, Page 26.

External links
 
 

Musicians from Berlin
German film score composers
Male film score composers
German male composers
German musical theatre composers
1932 births
2020 deaths